The IEEE Journal of Quantum Electronics is a peer-reviewed scientific journal covering optical, electrical, and electronics engineering, and some applied aspects of lasers, physical optics, and quantum electronics. It is published by the IEEE Photonics Society and was established in 1965. The editor-in-chief is Hon Ki Tsang (The Chinese University of Hong Kong). According to the Journal Citation Reports, the journal has a 2020 impact factor of 2.318.

Abstracting and indexing 
The journal is abstracted and indexed in:
 Science Citation Index
 Current Contents/Physical, Chemical & Earth Sciences
 Current Contents/Engineering, Computing & Technology

See also 
 IEEE Journal on Selected Topics in Quantum Electronics

References

External links 
 

Journal of Quantum Electronics
Optics journals
Semiconductor journals
Publications established in 1965
Electronics journals
Monthly journals
English-language journals
Nanotechnology journals